Jalan Tapah (Perak state route A10) is a major road in Perak, Malaysia.

List of junctions

Tapah